Fansher is a surname. Notable people with the surname include:

Burt Wendell Fansher (1880–1941), Canadian politician, brother of William
William Russell Fansher (1876–1957), Canadian politician

See also
Fancher
Fansler